The GRE Literature in English Test was a standardized test administered by the Educational Testing Service. It was intended to evaluate applicants seeking admission to a graduate program in English Studies. The test surveyed a wide range of topics related to literature in English, but the focus was mainly on works long 
accepted as part of the canon.

Scores were scaled and then reported as a number between 200 and 800; however, in recent versions of the test, the maximum and minimum reported scores had been 760 (corresponding to the 99 percentile) and 320 (1 percentile) respectively. The mean score for all test takers from July, 2009, to July, 2012, was 549 with a standard deviation of 99. ETS took the decision to discontinue the test after April 2021.

Content specification

The test contained 230 questions, grouped in four broad categories. Since many students who apply to graduate programs in English do so during the first half of their fourth year, the scope of most questions was largely that of the first three years of a standard American undergraduate English curriculum. A sampling of test item content is given below:

Literary analysis (40-55%)

 Conventions and genres
 Allusions and references
 Meaning and tone
 Grammar and rhetoric
 Literary techniques

Identification (15-20%)

This section tested the ability of examinees to perform recognition of date, author or work by style and/or content. The literary-historical scope of the test is as follows:

 Continental, classical and comparative literature through 1925 (5-10%)
 British literature through 1660 (including John Milton) (25-30%)
 British literature from 1660 to 1925 (25-30%)
 American literature through 1925 (15-25%)
 Literature in English after 1925 (20-30%)

Cultural and historical contexts (20-25%)

 Literary history
 Cultural history
 Identification of details in a work

Literary criticism (10-15%)

Identification and analysis of the characteristics and methods of various critical and theoretical approaches.

See also

 Graduate Record Examination
 GRE Biochemistry Test
 GRE Biology Test
 GRE Chemistry Test
 GRE Mathematics Test
 GRE Physics Test
 GRE Psychology Test
 Graduate Management Admission Test (GMAT)
 Graduate Aptitude Test in Engineering (GATE)

References

GRE standardized tests
English-language culture